is a Japanese alpine skier. He competed in the men's slalom at the 2006 Winter Olympics.

References

1979 births
Living people
Japanese male alpine skiers
Olympic alpine skiers of Japan
Alpine skiers at the 2006 Winter Olympics
Sportspeople from Yamagata Prefecture
Asian Games medalists in alpine skiing
Asian Games gold medalists for Japan
Alpine skiers at the 2007 Asian Winter Games
Medalists at the 2007 Asian Winter Games
21st-century Japanese people